"Spirit in the Sky" is a song by Norwegian music group Keiino. It was released as a digital download and for streaming on 25 January 2019 as the lead single from their debut studio album Okta. It represented Norway in the Eurovision Song Contest 2019 in Tel Aviv, Israel. It was performed during the second semi-final on 16 May 2019, and qualified for the final. It placed first in the televote with 291 points and finished in sixth place with 331 points overall.

Background
The song is an uptempo number, inspired by 80s disco and dance music, which has been described as dance-pop, electropop, yoik, and Sami folk music. It is about the struggles for equal rights regardless of ethnicity, gender identity and sexuality, given their long struggle in pursuit of equal rights. The music video of "Spirit in the Sky" was released on 4 April 2019.

It contains some lyrics in the Northern Sami language, Čajet dan čuovgga ("Show me the light") and the non-lexical vocables, He lå e loi la as part of the yoiking segment.

Eurovision Song Contest

The song was selected to represent Norway in the Eurovision Song Contest 2019, after Keiino were chosen through Melodi Grand Prix 2019, the music competition that selects Norway's entries for the Eurovision Song Contest. On 28 January 2019, a special allocation draw was held which placed each country into one of the two semi-finals, as well as which half of the show they would perform in. Norway was placed into the second semi-final, to be held on 16 May 2019, and was scheduled to perform in the second half of the show. After all the competing songs for the 2019 contest had been released, the running order for the semi-finals was decided by the show's producers rather than through another draw, so that similar songs were not placed next to each other. Norway performed in position 15, and qualified for the final, which took place on 18 May 2019. It placed first in the televote with 291 points and overall finished in sixth place with 331 points.

Charts

Certifications

See also 
"Sámiid ædnan" by Sverre Kjelsberg and Mattis Hætta. Another song containing joik representing Norway at the Eurovision Song Contest 1980.

References

Notes

2019 songs
Eurovision songs of 2019
Eurovision songs of Norway
Number-one singles in Norway
Songs against racism and xenophobia
LGBT-related songs
Melodi Grand Prix songs of 2019